Ed Rynders (February 17, 1960 – May 13, 2022) was an American politician who served in the Georgia House of Representatives from 2003–2019.

References

1960 births
2022 deaths
Republican Party members of the Georgia House of Representatives